Neglected by His Wife (Swedish: Försummad av sin fru or Gift med Klara Klok) is a 1947 Swedish comedy film directed by Gösta Folke and starring Irma Christenson,  Karl-Arne Holmsten and Agneta Prytz. It was shot at the Centrumateljéerna Studios in Stockholm. The film's sets were designed by the art director Bibi Lindström.

Synopsis
Two newlywed journalists barely have time to see each other due to their work, leading to the husband feeling neglected by his wife. He cooks dinner for her three evenings in a row, only for her to not turn up. He then writes asking for advice to the lonely hearts column she writes for the newspaper.

Cast
 Irma Christenson as 	Siska Hedberg
 Karl-Arne Holmsten as Pelle Hedberg
 Agneta Prytz as 	Tove Larsson
 Lars Kåge as Torsten Söderlund
 Carl Hagman as 	Löfgren
 Åke Claesson as 	Chief Editor
 Harry Ahlin as 	Olsson
 Barbro Flodquist as 	Journalist
 Georg Skarstedt as 	Linde
 Torsten Bergström as 	Westlund
 Arne Lindblad as 	Night Editor
 Margit Andelius as 	Lady at Library 
 Julie Bernby as 	Lisbeth 
 Artur Cederborgh as 	Porter 
 Erland Colliander as 	Hansson 
 Signe Lundberg-Settergren as Cashier
 Ludde Juberg as 	Hot Dog Salesman 
 Birger Lensander as 	Worker 
 Gunnar Öhlund as 	Maître d' 
 Ingrid Luterkort as Journalist 
 Segol Mann as 	Journalist 
 David Erikson as 	Man Seeking Advice
 John Norrman as 	Man with Sandwich Board 
 Sif Ruud as Wife
 Hugo Tranberg as 	Janitor at Library 
 Gunnel Wadner as 	Waitress

References

Bibliography 
 Krawc, Alfred. International Directory of Cinematographers, Set- and Costume Designers in Film: Denmark, Finland, Norway, Sweden (from the beginnings to 1984). Saur, 1986.

External links 
 

1947 films
Swedish comedy films
1947 comedy films
1940s Swedish-language films
Films directed by Gösta Folke
Swedish black-and-white films
Films set in Stockholm
1940s Swedish films